Epicopiopsis is a genus of moths in the family Epicopeiidae described by Karl Grünberg in 1908. The Global Lepidoptera Names Index has this genus as a synonym of Epicopeia.

Species
 Epicopiopsis albofasciata Djakonov, 1926
 Epicopiopsis battaka Dohrn, 1895
 Epicopiopsis caroli Janet, 1909
 Epicopiopsis hainesii Holland, 1889
 Epicopiopsis leucomelaena Oberthür, 1919
 Epicopiopsis longicauda Matsumura, 1931
 Epicopiopsis mencia Moore, 1874
 Epicopiopsis polydora Westwood, 1841
 Epicopiopsis philenora Westwood, 1841

References

Epicopeiidae